This is a list of all the United States Supreme Court cases from volume 393 of the United States Reports:

External links

1968 in United States case law
1969 in United States case law